"I'm Gonna Soothe You" is a song by American singer Maria McKee, released in May 1993 as the lead single from her second studio album, You Gotta Sin to Get Saved. It was written by McKee, Marvin Etzioni and Bruce Brody, and produced by George Drakoulias. "I'm Gonna Soothe You" reached No. 35 in the UK and remained on the charts for three weeks.

Critical reception
Upon release, Larry Flick from Billboard said, "Fans and newcomers to the singer's sound will indeed be soothed by the Motown influences on this swaying, '70s-fashioned slow-rock number. It's easy to imagine folks devouring this sound. Spin it." A reviewer from Cash Box noted its "steady rocking reassurance", adding that "the singer's crystal-line vocals cut straight to the heart". Pan-European magazine Music & Media wrote, "A marked change of direction, Maria goes Stax R&B, and Black Crowes producer Drakoulias pushed the right buttons. Taken from the upcoming album You've Gotta Sin, To Get Saved, this sounds like the right stuff." Musician said, "The album opens with "I'm Gonna Soothe You," a mid-tempo ballad with enough 70s-redolent strings and horns that you might check to make sure the CD doesn't have a Hi insignia."

Music video
A music video was filmed to promote the single, directed by English film, documentary and music video director Julien Temple. It achieved play on Power Play Music Video Television and VH1.

Track listings

CD single (UK release)
"I'm Gonna Soothe You (LP Version)" - 3:35
"Why Wasn't I More Grateful (When Life Was Sweet) (LP Version)" - 5:05
"This Thing (Don't Lead To Heaven)" - 3:31

CD single (UK limited edition release)
"I'm Gonna Soothe You (LP Version)" - 3:35
"If Love Is a Red Dress, Hang Me in Rags (Acoustic Demo Version)" - 4:57
"Show Me Heaven (Acoustic Demo Version)" - 3:40

CD single (French release)
"I'm Gonna Soothe You (LP Version)" - 3:35
"Why Wasn't I More Grateful (When Life Was Sweet) (LP Version)" - 5:05
"Show Me Heaven (Acoustic Demo Version)" - 3:40

Cassette single (UK release)
"I'm Gonna Soothe You (LP Version)" - 3:35
"Why Wasn't I More Grateful (When Life Was Sweet) (LP Version)" - 5:05

Personnel
 Maria McKee - lead vocals
 Edna Wright, Julia Waters, Maxine Waters - backing vocals
 George Drakoulias - producer

Other
 Dennis Hopper - photography
 Janet Wolsborn - art direction

Charts

References

1993 songs
1993 singles
Geffen Records singles
Music videos directed by Julien Temple
Songs written by Maria McKee
Songs written by Marvin Etzioni